Madeline "Maddie" Coleman is a fictional character on the American soap opera As the World Turns. She was originally portrayed by Alexandra Chando, who portrayed the role from July 27, 2005, to October 26, 2007, and by Kelli Barrett from December 22, 2008, to January 5, 2009. Alexandra Chando returned to the show as Maddie on September 23, 2009.

She is the youngest in a family of eight children. Her older brother Henry Coleman is her best friend and was the only person who paid attention to her while she was growing up.

Character history
Maddie has no friends at the summer of 2005. Henry picks her up, assuming she's only there for one night. However, Maddie makes it clear that she intends to stay in Oakdale for a while and asks if she can stay with him and his wife Katie. However, Maddie does not know that Henry's marriage to Katie wasn't out of love and he didn't tell her yet that he and Katie had divorced. Maddie soon meets Mike Kasnoff, Katie's new boyfriend and the reason she and Henry got married in the first place; to make Mike jealous. Maddie doesn't like Mike and intends on bringing her brother and Katie back together again. Katie tries to find a place for Maddie to stay, because Katie now lives with Mike and doesn't want Maddie around. She asks her sister, Margo and she agrees, Maddie can stay with her. Maddie meets with Margo's son Casey and the two take an instant dislike to each other. They're not happy on living under the same roof and try to undo the decision.

Meanwhile, Maddie discovers a man named Byron Glass on Katie's old high school picture, and tries to get in touch with him, so he can break up Katie and Mike. At the same time, Katie's new boss BJ starts showing an interest in Katie and Maddie wonders if she should stop contacting Byron, since BJ is now in the picture. Henry discovers Maddie's plan and makes her break the contact with Byron. Not much later, BJ becomes obsessed with Katie and Maddie begins to put some pieces together and realizes BJ is actually Byron. Henry discovers it at the same time and confronts BJ, who locks him up in his cellar. Maddie worries over her brother, who she hasn't seen for a while and Casey starts to pick up on that. When she confides in him, he decides to help her and the two sniffle around in BJ's office to find prove of his lies. The two start to get deeper into their investigation, until BJ realizes what they're doing and he sets a trap, a bomb in the WOAK station, where a contest is going on at the time. Henry is able to free himself in the meantime and he hurries to the station, where the bomb goes off. Everyone gets out alright, but BJ escapes. Margo sets up an investigation and swears to hunt down the person who ever got BJ to Oakdale, who in fact was Maddie. She once again asks Casey for help and the two steal evidence and plant fake ones, and the investigation is eventually closed. Maddie does go over to Katie to confess what she has done, but Katie forgives her.

Because of the whole event, Maddie and Casey have gotten closer, now building a close friendship which is often confused with more by other people. When Casey's one-night stand Gwen and his ex-best friend Will Munson go on the run, he tries to help his mother in finding them, still angry with them because of everything that happened between them. Maddie, at the same time, stumbles on the pair and decides to help them and hides them in the closed nightclub Metro. When she hears that Gwen is falsely accused by Will's mother Barbara Ryan, she plants fake evidence so the cops won't look at Metro. Casey soon discovers what Maddie is up to and intends to go to the cops. Maddie convinces him not to and he helps Gwen and Will being safe. However, the cops still find out soon and Margo brings Gwen and Will downtown, where Gwen is charged with assault on Barbara. Maddie and Casey find evidence that Gwen didn't do it and Gwen is cleared. This has brought Maddie and Casey even closer and the two start a tumultuous relationship, which isn't approved by Margo. She eventually kicks Maddie out, unable to let her son live under the same roof as his girlfriend, afraid he will once again knock someone up.

Maddie and Casey continue to see each other and both Gwen and Will are surprised several times by how Casey has changed for Maddie. One night, Maddie and Casey prepare to sleep with each other for the first time, when both Margo and Tom are out of town. When Maddie arrives at Casey's, she runs into a new cop, Dallas Griffin. The two seem to know each other, but only share a brief conversation, after which Maddie is spooked. She is unable to make love to Casey and breaks up with him. In the days after, she starts having flashbacks to something that happened to her in the past, something she can't clearly remember. She tries to confide in Henry, but they're cut off several times. She is hurt when Casey gets a new girlfriend, though she doesn't know Casey only does that so he won't have to deal with the pain of losing Maddie. Maddie becomes violent towards Lia, Casey's girlfriend and shows this by threatening Lia. When Lia is found dead a few days later, people point to Maddie as the prime suspect and Maddie is arrested. Her sister Eve has come to Oakdale and Maddie remembers what happened to her; she was raped by Louis, Eve's husband. Maddie confides in Henry, Eve, Margo and Dallas, who was the paroling officer the night Maddie was raped, but she leaves out the part that Louis raped her, and she makes up a story about a frat party and a senior student.

When another student is murdered later that week, Maddie is once again the prime suspect. However, when later Gwen is attacked, Maddie is released and she is attacked herself. Oakdale now deals with a serial killer and the cops have no idea who it is. Casey, Will and Gwen decide to take a road trip, away from all the things that are going on in Oakdale. Maddie follows them to Raven Lake, and so do a few other teenagers. Their trip proves to be a horrible and fatal mistake when the Slasher follows them and starts killing the teenagers one by one at night. Having no contact with their parents, who have no idea what's going on, the teenagers are cut from the outside world and have to survive on their own. Maddie finally tells Casey what happened to her and he keeps her with him, trying to protect her against the Slasher, only to be killed himself. Maddie continues her way in an attempt to find her friends. When she runs into Louis, who was the next prime suspect, she's convinced he's the killer. However, he tries to confess something to her, but is stabbed and killed from behind by the real Slasher. In Oakdale, the parents and cops have realized what is going on at Raven Lake and they head over, stumbling over the many bodies that are left behind. Maddie faces her attacker and is about to be killed when Casey rescues her, showing he didn't actually die. He knocks the Slasher unconscious and Maddie takes of his mask, revealing that the Slasher in no other than her sister Eve. The teenagers who survived are found by the cops and Eve is arrested. Her motive for killing the teenagers and blaming Maddie for it was the fact that Louis raped Maddie. Eve turned it around and saw it as Maddie seducing Louis.

After a few sessions of therapy and long conversations, Maddie and Casey make up and start their relationship again. With his help, she is slowly able to give everything a place and move on with her life. She is surprised when Casey starts buying her expensive gifts and wonders where he got the money from. He claims to have gotten a better job and at first, Maddie believes him. However, she soon starts to recognize the sign that Henry and her own mother had and she realizes that Casey, just like Henry and her mother, is gambling. She confronts him and he tells her he will stop gambling. He doesn't though, and Maddie once again begs him to stop. Suddenly, Will's trust fund is stolen and Will himself is blamed for it. Maddie puts the pieces together and discovers that Casey stole the bonds, but Adam, his brother, set Will up, in order to get Will's wife Gwen. Casey is arrested and Adam flees town. Angry that he won't help Casey out, Maddie follows Gwen to the woods, who was asked by Adam to come there. When she sees Adam trying to kiss Gwen, she panics, getting flashbacks to her own rape. She grabs a branch and hits Adam on the back of his head, after which he falls down and doesn't breathe anymore. Gwen decides to bury Adam, because Margo will never forgive Maddie if she finds out what she did to her son. However, Gwen starts to get anonymous gifts and even finds the branch in her bed one time. Convinced that Adam might still be alive, she fills in Will and they want to escape Oakdale with Maddie. Maddie breaks things off with Casey, unable to lie to him after what she has done to his brother. She and Will and Gwen are about to leave town when Casey shows up, who finds out what they did. He assures Maddie he isn't mad and they make up. They're soon attacked by Adam, who is still alive, and wants revenge on the girls. Maddie knocked out and the boys are locked up. They break free in time to help Maddie and stop Adam from raping Gwen. They make Adam leave town and the four return home.

However, Maddie and Casey both know what will happen now. Casey left town on bail and is now also charged with attempt to escape. He is convicted to six months prison. He and Maddie try to make the best of the little time they have, and finally make love to each other. A few days later, it is time and Casey leaves for prison. Maddie keeps in touch with him and sends him video messages and updates of everything. However, three months after being sent to jail, Casey sends Maddie a letter where he breaks up with her. He feels unworthy of being her boyfriend and also explains he won't come back to Oakdale after being released. Maddie is heartbroken and confides in Luke Snyder, a new friend with whom she is interns at WOAK. They meet Noah, another intern, and along with Will and Gwen, they decide to go to Branson for the weekend. Maddie confides in Noah about her heartache and the two end up in bed together. Back in Oakdale, they decide to start a relationship, often rushed by Noah when he tries to prove to his father that he loves Maddie. Maddie soon finds out that Noah is actually in love with Luke, who is also gay. Though she feels betrayed, she wishes them the best and even stands up to Noah's homophobic father.

Before he was sentenced to prison, Casey secretly submitted an application to Wesleyan University on Maddie's behalf. A few weeks later, Maddie receives her acceptance letter from Wesleyan. She had planned to attend the University — because it had been "a dream of mine since I knew what college was."  Maddie now has doubts about going off to Wesleyan, but eventually comes to the decision to move on with her life and become the collegiate straight A student Casey always told her she would become. She says goodbye to her brother and friends, and leaves Oakdale to start at Wesleyan.

On December 22, 2008, Maddie returns to Oakdale just in time for Christmas, surprising Casey at the Hughes family home. Despite Casey's insistence that she is far better off without him in her life, Maddie refuses to listen to him. However, when Alison arrives, Maddie becomes uncomfortable and runs off. Later on, Maddie comes across Noah and Luke, to whom she explains that she's returned to town after breaking things off with her boyfriend at Wesleyan. Maddie and Noah continue to talk, deeply upsetting Luke. Meanwhile, Alison attempts to convince Casey that Maddie's return may be destiny, but he refuses to listen to Alison, out of fear he may hurt Maddie again. When Ali and Margo finally manage to convince Casey to ask Maddie as his date on New Year's Eve, Casey can't keep his mind off of Alison, and leaves Maddie to sleep with Ali. Maddie, hurt by his betrayal, leaves Oakdale not much later.

On September 23, 2009, Alison calls Maddie and asks her to return to Oakdale to help out Adam, who has returned as well and will go to jail for assaulting Gwen and Maddie, unless Maddie testifies and drops the charges. Maddie agrees and comes back, and Casey becomes furious when he sees Adam and Maddie in the same room and warns his brother to stay away from Maddie. A few days later, Alison breaks up with Casey, believing it's for the best, and Maddie and Casey pick up their close bond from years ago. She's there to support Casey when his uncle Brad dies and joins him at the funeral. When Maddie asks Casey if they're getting back together, and if so, should she take a leave of absence at Wesleyan, Casey agrees they are a couple again. Excited, Maddie starts making plans, not knowing Casey is partly using their newfound love to make Alison jealous. Maddie soon realizes whats happened, but she and Casey remain friends, although not as close. Maddie starts writing a blog and starts a friendship with Hunter, although she gets frustrated with him at first, they become closer. She spends her last days in Oakdale helping Noah. She plans to be roommates with him on her last day onscreen.
On March 3, 2010, it was mentioned that Maddie returned to Wesleyan messing up plans with being roommates with Noah.

Notes

References

External links
Maddie Coleman on Myspace

As the World Turns characters
Television characters introduced in 2005
Female characters in television